Mohammed Ali Qamar is a boxer from Kolkata, India. He was the first Indian to win a gold medal in the discipline of boxing in the Commonwealth Games at the 2002 Commonwealth Games held in Manchester. Born into the Ghettoes of Kidderpore in Kolkata, Qamar was inducted into boxing at an early age by his father at the Kidderpore School of Physical Education, and was coached by Cheena Bhai. Qamar became the Inter-district champion in the state of West Bengal in 1991. He won the Light Flyweight category at the national sub-junior levels from 1992 to 1996. Qamar had a strong showing in the 1999 World Amateur Boxing Championships in Houston, reaching the quarter finals before losing to Ron Siler of the United States. At the 2002 Commonwealth Games in Manchester, Qamar upset the home favorite Darren Langley 27-25 in the final, outscoring Langley 10-3 and surviving a standing count in the dramatic final round after trailing by 5 points at the beginning of the fourth and last round. Qamar's career was plagued by injury and he did not win a major competition again, losing in the quarterfinals at the 2002 Asian Games at Pusan. Qamar's neighborhood of Kidderpore is the hub of Women's boxing in India, who claim Qamar as one of their inspirations.

Awards
Arjuna Award, 2002
Drona Award, 2022

See also 
2002 Commonwealth Games

References

Indian male boxers
Indian Muslims
Sportspeople from Kolkata
Year of birth missing (living people)
Living people
Commonwealth Games gold medallists for India
Boxers at the 2002 Commonwealth Games
Recipients of the Arjuna Award
Boxers at the 2002 Asian Games
Commonwealth Games medallists in boxing
Boxers from West Bengal
Asian Games competitors for India
Light-flyweight boxers
21st-century Bengalis
Bengali Muslims
Recipients of the Dronacharya Award
Medallists at the 2002 Commonwealth Games